This is a list of historic places in Essex County, Ontario, containing heritage sites listed on the Canadian Register of Historic Places (CRHP), all of which are designated as historic places either locally, provincially, territorially, nationally, or by more than one level of government.

List of historic places

See also

List of historic places in Southwestern Ontario
List of historic places in Ontario
List of National Historic Sites of Canada in Ontario

References

Essex